Carpal branch of the radial artery may refer to:

 Dorsal carpal branch of the radial artery
 Palmar carpal branch of radial artery